Chung Eui-hwa (Korean: 정의화; Hanja: 鄭義和; born 18 December 1948) is a South Korean doctor and politician who served as Speaker of the National Assembly from 2014 to 2016.

Early life and education 
Chung Eui-hwa was born in Changwon-gun, South Gyeongsang Province, South Korea on December 18, 1948. He graduated from Pusan National University medical school.

Political career 
Chung became a politician in 1996 when he ran in the 1996 South Korean legislative election for the Busan Jung-gu · Dong-gu electoral district and won with 41.6% of the vote. He continuously won the Busan Jung-gu · Dong-gu electoral district until 2012.

Chung was pro-Lee Myung-bak during the 2007 South Korean presidential election.

He assumed the position of Speaker of the National Assembly on May 30, 2014. Since then, Chung has been an Independent and critical of the pro-Park Geun-hye faction of the Liberty Korea Party.

References 

1948 births
Living people
20th-century South Korean politicians
21st-century South Korean politicians
Members of the National Assembly (South Korea)
Speakers of the National Assembly (South Korea)
Liberty Korea Party politicians
People Power Party (South Korea) politicians
Pusan National University alumni
Yonsei University alumni
People from Changwon
Deputy Speakers of the National Assembly (South Korea)